A Slight Case of Overbombing is a greatest hits album by English gothic rock band the Sisters of Mercy. It was released on 23 August 1993 on the band's own label, Merciful Release, under distribution contract with East West Records. All the tracks featured on this compilation album are in reverse chronological order of release. A Slight Case of Overbombing contains mostly remixes and edited versions of songs that the Sisters of Mercy had released by 1993, as well as two never-before released tracks: a re-recorded version of "Temple of Love" from 1992, and one new track, "Under the Gun", which was released as a single to promote this compilation album and is also the band's most recent single as of 2023.

Track listing

Personnel
Track 1
Andrew Eldritch – vocals, keyboards
Adam Pearson – guitar
Doktor Avalanche (drum machine) – drums

Track 2
Andrew Eldritch – vocals, keyboards
Tim Bricheno – guitar
Andreas Bruhn – guitar
Doktor Avalanche (drum machine) – drums

Tracks 3–6
Andrew Eldritch – vocals, keyboards
Tim Bricheno – guitar
Andreas Bruhn – guitar
Tony James – bass guitar
Doktor Avalanche (drum machine) – drums

Tracks 7–9
Andrew Eldritch – vocals, guitars, keyboards
Patricia Morrison – bass guitar
Doktor Avalanche (drum machine) – drums, synth bass

Tracks 10–12
Andrew Eldritch – vocals, keyboards
Craig Adams – bass guitar
Wayne Hussey – guitars
Gary Marx – guitars
Doktor Avalanche (drum machine) – drums

Additional personnel
Terri Nunn – vocals 
Ofra Haza – vocals 
Tony James – bass guitar 
Maggie Reilly – backing vocals 
John Perry – guitar

Charts

Weekly charts

Year-end charts

Certifications

References

The Sisters of Mercy compilation albums
1993 greatest hits albums
East West Records compilation albums
Merciful Release compilation albums